Acalyptris acontarcha is a moth of the family Nepticulidae. It was described by Edward Meyrick in 1926. It is known from Katwar, India. The hostplant for the species is Hymenodictyon obovatum.

References

Nepticulidae
Endemic fauna of India
Moths of Asia
Moths described in 1926